Lampetiopus is a genus of flies in the family Stratiomyidae.

Distribution
Madagascar.

Species
Lampetiopus umbrosus Lindner, 1936

References

Stratiomyidae
Brachycera genera
Taxa named by Erwin Lindner
Diptera of Africa
Endemic fauna of Madagascar